Pasi Patokallio (born 29 September 1949) is a Finnish diplomat.  He has served as the Ambassador of Finland to Israel, Canada and Australia, and led Finland's campaign for a seat on the United Nations Security Council in 2012.

An expert on arms proliferation, Patokallio served as the Director for Arms Control and Disarmament at the Finnish Ministry for Foreign Affairs, the Chairperson of the 2nd Biennial Meeting of States for the United Nations Conference on the Illicit Trade in Small Arms, the Chairman of the Nuclear Suppliers Group and the Chair of two sessions of the Preparatory Committee of the Nuclear Non-Proliferation Treaty.  Patokallio was a candidate to head the United Nations Monitoring, Verification and Inspection Commission (UNMOVIC) weapons inspection organisation in Iraq, a role that eventually went to Swedish diplomat Hans Blix.

He is also a noted critic of the Ottawa Treaty banning anti-personnel mines, which Finland joined in 2012 during the presidency of Tarja Halonen.  Patokallio argues that given Finland's lengthy border with Russia, unilaterally signing the treaty when Russia did not caused “irreparable harm” to Finland's defence posture.

References 

Ambassadors of Finland to Australia
Ambassadors of Finland to Canada
Ambassadors of Finland to Israel
Living people
1949 births